The Vinson House is a historic house at 2123 Broadway in Little Rock, Arkansas.  It is a single-story wood-frame structure, with broad Classical Revival styling.  It has a hip roof, with projecting gables on several sides, and a modillioned cornice.  A porch wraps around three sides of the house, supported by Ionic columns.  The main entrance is framed by sidelight and transom windows, with pilasters and an entablature.  The house was built in 1905 to a design by noted Arkansas architect Charles L. Thompson.

The house was listed on the National Register of Historic Places in 1976.

See also
National Register of Historic Places listings in Little Rock, Arkansas

References

Houses on the National Register of Historic Places in Arkansas
Neoclassical architecture in Arkansas
Houses completed in 1905
Houses in Little Rock, Arkansas
National Register of Historic Places in Little Rock, Arkansas
Historic district contributing properties in Arkansas
1905 establishments in Arkansas